Hibbertia cymosa is a species of flowering plant in the family Dilleniaceae and is endemic to a restricted area of Queensland. It is a shrub with densely hairy foliage, elliptic leaves, and yellow flowers, each with fifty to eighty stamens arranged in bundles around three carpels.

Description
Flowering occurs around June.

Taxonomy
Hibbertia cymosa was first formally described in 1991 by Sally T. Reynolds in the journal Austrobaileya from specimens collected by Anthony Bean near Jowalbinna (near Laura) in 1990. The specific epithet (cymosa) refers to the cymose arrangement of the flowers.

Distribution and habitat
This hibbertia is only known from the type location where the species grows near a creek.

Conservation status
Goodenia cymosa is classified as "vulnerable" under the Queensland Government Nature Conservation Act 1992.

See also
List of Hibbertia species

References

cymosa
Flora of Queensland
Plants described in 1991